Freda Betti (26 February 1924 – 13 November 1979), whose birth name was Frédérique Thérèse Augusta Betti, was a French mezzo-soprano singer whose career was mainly confined to France. She left a range of recordings representative of her repertoire.

Biography 
Freda Betti was born at 52 rue des Ponchettes in the district of Vieux-Nice in a modest family : her father was a house painter and her mother a fishmonger. His paternal family originates from the region of Emilia-Romagna in Italy : his grandfather was born in Parma and he immigrated to Nice with his wife and children in 1893.

She studied music and especially singing at the Conservatory of Nice with Édouard Rouard, where she obtained a Premier Prix de Chant in 1943. She made her debut at the Opéra de Monte-Carlo in 1947 as Siébel in Faust by Charles Gounod. She appeared frequently with the Orchestre Philharmonique de Radio France of the RTF in the early 1950s, before entering the troupe of the Opéra-Comique in the 1960s. She sang the title role in particular of Carmen by Georges Bizet which she sang more than 150 times, and her repertoire also included Fricka, Brangaene, Dulcinée in Don Quichotte and Suzuki.

Betti sang on major national stages (Nantes, Nice, Strasbourg, Toulouse) and European (Monte-Carlo, La Scala), as well as in numerous opera festivals, including Aix-en-Provence, Avignon, Bayreuth.

Betti recorded for Philips and EMI. Among published recordings she took part in were The Snow Maiden (Bobilicka), Démophon, Tosca (shepherd boy) and Philippine (Isabelle). In 1958 she recorded excerpts from Carmen with Ken Neate, Gabriel Bacquier and Andréa Guiot on Philips P 77118 L.

She also participated in the original production of L'Opéra d'Aran by Gilbert Bécaud, in 1962, at the Théâtre des Champs-Élysées. Betti sang the title role of La Périchole on French Culture radio in 1964.

In the 1970s she was a vocal teacher at the Conservatory of Monaco.

Freda Betti died at her home in Nice in 1979, at the age of 55, and is buried in the family vault "Famille Betti" with her husband and his parents in the Cimetière du Château ("Carré de l'O.N.U").

Personal life 
Freda Betti was married on 29 October 1949 in Levallois-Perret to René Clermont (1919–1976). The couple had two children.

Freda Betti was the sister of Henri Betti and the great grandaunt of Alexy Bosetti but she has no family relationship with Laura Betti and Priscilla Betti.

Repertory 
Her list of roles include:
 1947: Faust by Charles Gounod – Marthe Schwertlein
 1950: Le domino noir by Daniel Auber – Ursule
 1951: L'ivrogne corrigé by Christoph Willibald Gluck – Mathurine
 1952: Le joueur de flûte by Hervé – Busa
 1952: Jenůfa by Leoš Janáček – the judge's wife
 1953: At the Sign of the Reine Pédauque by Charles-Gaston Levadé – Jeannette
 1954: Roméo et Juliette by Charles Gounod – Gertrude
 1955: The Barber of Seville by Gioachino Rossini – Berta
 1955: The Snow Maiden by Nikolai Rimsky-Korsakov – Bobilichka
 1956: Le Jour et la Nuit by Charles Lecocq – Sanchette
 1956: Le Médium by Gian Carlo Menotti – Madame Nolan
 1956: La Périchole by Jacques Offenbach – Mastrillas, Brambilla
 1956: Madame l’Archiduc by Jacques Offenbach – the Countess
 1957: Gillette de Narbonne by Edmond Audran – Gillette de Narbonne
 1957: Les bavards by Jacques Offenbach – Béatrix
 1958: The Love for Three Oranges by Sergei Prokofiev – Linette
 1960: Le Médecin malgré lui by Charles Gounod – Martine
 1961: Padmâvatî by Albert Roussel – a woman of the people and the second woman of the palace
 1961: Lavinia by Henry Barraud – Nunziatina
 1961: Rip Van Winkle by Robert Planquette – Kate
 1962: Orpheus in the Underworld by Jacques Offenbach – Public Opinion
 1962: Rhodope by Louis Ganne – Nausicaa
 1963: Giroflé-Girofla by Charles Lecocq – Aurore
 1964: La chanson de Fortunio by Jacques Offenbach – Babet

TV appearances 
 1956: Le Médium (adaptation of The Medium) by Claude Loursais : Madame Nolan. (RTF)
 1957: Les Bavards  (adaptation of Les bavards) by Bronislaw Horowicz : Béatrice. (RTF)
 1960: Le Médecin malgré lui (adaptation of Le médecin malgré lui) by Claude Loursais : Martine. (RTF)

Anecdote 
In 1948, Freda Betti sang two songs composed by her brother Henri Betti in two radio programs broadcast on Paris Inter : Le Bonheur du Monde (lyrics by Maurice Vandair) and Je Cherche une Étoile (lyrics by René Rouzaud).

In 2018, Benoît Duteurtre hosts the radio show Étonnez-moi Benoît devoted to the career of his brother Henri Betti with the participation of his nephew and grand-nephew : François and Olivier Betti. During this radio show which is broadcast on France Musique on April 28, the host passes a sample of the opera-bouffe Le Jour et la Nuit composed in 1881 by Charles Lecocq with lyrics of Eugène Leterrier and Albert Vanloo that Freda Betti had played in 1956 as Sanchette.

References

External links
 
 
 
 Freda Betti at the Bibliotheque nationale de France
 Freda Betti at the Discogs
 Freda Betti at the Gallica
 Freda Betti at the Art Lyrique Français
 Freda Betti at the Operaclass
 Freda Betti at the Les Archives du Spectacle
 Freda Betti at the La Médiathèque de l’Architecture et du Patrimoine
 Freda Betti at the Cimetières de France et d’ailleurs
 Freda Betti at the Geneastar

People from Nice
1924 births
1979 deaths
French operatic mezzo-sopranos
Voice teachers
20th-century French women opera singers
People of Emilian descent
French people of Italian descent
Women music educators